Early Music New York is a New York City-based early music group presented by the Early Music Foundation. The group's director and conductor is Frederick Renz.

History
After his old early music band, New York Pro Musica, disbanded in 1974, Renz founded the Ensemble for Early Music, and founded the Grande Bande (also known as New York's Grande Bande of Original Instruments) as an offshoot of the Ensemble two years later. Both groups were affiliated with Renz's Early Music Foundation, which he had established in 1974. In 1992, the Ensemble for Early Music (also known as the New York Ensemble for Early Music and the New York's Ensemble for Early Music) had five members. It was renamed Early Music New York in 2002.

References

Early music groups
Nonesuch Records artists
Musical groups established in 1974
1974 establishments in New York City
Musical groups from New York City